Hugh Orr (21 January 1878 - 16 May 1946) was a Scotland international rugby union player.

Rugby Union career

Orr played for London Scottish.

He was capped by Anglo-Scots in 1902 playing in their match against South of Scotland District. He played for the Anglo-Scots in the same fixture in the 1903 season, scoring a try.

He was capped 5 times for the Scotland international side, in the period 1903 to 1904. Orr was in team that won the 1903 Home Nations Championship, and played for Scotland in the following season's 1904 Home Nations Championship matches which helped secure that championship.

Military career

He joined the Royal Navy in 1892. He became a Lieutenant in 1899 and an Assistant Inspector of the Naval Ordnance Inspection Staff.

References

1878 births
1946 deaths
Scotland international rugby union players
Scottish rugby union players
Rugby union centres
London Scottish F.C. players
Scottish Exiles (rugby union) players